Kodaly is a village in Thrissur district, in the state of Kerala, India.
It is 30 km away from Thrissur city and 8 km from Kodakara and belongs to the Mattathur panchayath.

Economy
This place acts as the Local hub of trade and commerce  for the people from the nearby villages.

The Kodakara - Vellikulangara road which can be used to reach Athirapilly and Chalakkudy passes through Kodaly. There is bus routes from here to Thrissur, Irinjalakkuda, Chalakkudy, Varandarappilly Ernakulam angamalyetc.

The villages near by Kodaly are Kizhekke Kodaly (East Kodaly), Chembuchira, Mankuttyppadam, Kadambode, Chelakkattukara, Moonnumury, murukkingal, thalooppadam, perumpilly chira, inchakundu, vellikullangara etc.

State Bank of Travancore, Federal Bank, Syndicate Bank, South Indian Bank, Kerala Grameen Bank , Kerala Bank has Branches here.
The Post office here is addressed as P.O.Pady (Pin Code:680699).

Landmarks
Some of the landmarks of Kodaly are 
  Edayatt Srikrishnan Temple
  Government L.P.School
  Government community Health Center
  Sports Ground
  Indian Oil Petrol Pump
  Hotel Ceaser palace (3 Star)
  Sree Narayana Vidya Mandir Central School
  St.Sebastian's Chapel, Kodaly.
  Market Junction, Kodaly.
  Annampadam Junction
  sri rudhhiramala bagavathy temple
  Axis college of engineering and technology, east kodaly
Sreelakshmi movies 2K
Kerala State beverages cooperation outlet
Juma masjid Kodaly

References 

Villages in Thrissur district